Senator Eldridge may refer to:

Charles W. Eldridge (1877–1965), Massachusetts State Senate
Jamie Eldridge (born 1973), Massachusetts State Senate

See also
Charles A. Eldredge (1820–1896), Wisconsin State Senate